Bulgaria sent a delegation to compete at the 2010 Winter Paralympics, in Vancouver, British Columbia, Canada. It fielded a total of three athletes, all of whom competed in cross-country skiing. It did not win a medal.

Cross-country skiing 

The following three athletes represented Bulgaria in cross-country skiing:

See also
Bulgaria at the 2010 Winter Olympics
Bulgaria at the Paralympics

References

External links
Vancouver 2010 Paralympic Games official website
International Paralympic Committee official website

Nations at the 2010 Winter Paralympics
2010
Paralympics